Pablo Ortega may refer to:

 Pablo Ortega (baseball) (born 1976), Mexican pitcher
 Pablo Ortega (footballer) (born 1994), Argentine midfielder